Almirante Marcos A. Zar Airport  is an airport in Trelew, Chubut Province, Argentina, named after the Argentine Navy Admiral and aviator Marcos Andrés Zar. The airport serves the cities of Trelew and Rawson.

It has a  passenger terminal and has parking for 128 cars. It is operated by London Supply.

The Trelew Almirante Zar Naval Air Base is on the airport, and has an Argentine Naval Aviation squadron flying P-3 Orions.

History
This airport replaced an airport noted as a pivotal site during the Trelew massacre. On August 15, 1972, 110 prisoners escaped from the Rawson jail and tried to hijack an Austral Líneas Aéreas BAC One-Eleven en route to Comodoro Rivadavia, in order to escape to Chile and from there to Cuba. Their plans failed, and 19 of them were killed by the army on August 22, at 3:30 AM.

Airlines and destinations

See also

Transport in Argentina
List of airports in Argentina

References

External links

OurAirports - Almirante Marco Andres Zar Airport
Organismo Regulador del Sistema Nacional de Aeropuertos

Aeropuertos Argentina 2000

Airports in Chubut Province
Argentine Naval Air Bases